Markwood is an unincorporated community located along U.S. Route 50/U.S. Route 220 (also known as the Northwestern Turnpike) in the Mill Creek Valley west of Burlington in Mineral County, West Virginia, United States. The ZIP code for Markwood is 26710.

Historic sites 
It was built for the wagon trains going west and would house the travelers in a large rock house, and feed and water the horses before going over the mountains. Nowadays, it is better known as the "Stone House".

Mr. John T. McDowell (born 1870) and Mr. Luke Markwood, saw a need for a place of worship.  Mr. Markwood donated the land upon which was built a Church and a School, therefore giving the community the name of Markwood.

Unincorporated communities in Mineral County, West Virginia
Unincorporated communities in West Virginia
Northwestern Turnpike